Parvyn Kaur Singh is an Australian singer and dancer. Her debut album, Sa, was nominated for the 2022 ARIA Award for Best World Music Album. 

Parvyn was the frontwoman of Melbourne band The Bombay Royale, from joining them in 2010 through to there finish in 2021. She then started a solo career, releasing Sa in 2021.

Discography

Albums

Awards

ARIA Music Awards
The ARIA Music Awards is an annual awards ceremony that recognises excellence, innovation, and achievement across all genres of Australian music.

|-
| 2022
| Sa
| Best World Music Album
| 
|-

References

External links
Parvyn - Home

20th-century Australian women singers